Dennis Elwood Sothern (January 20, 1904 – December 7, 1977) was an American professional baseball outfielder. He played in Major League Baseball for the Philadelphia Phillies, Pittsburgh Pirates, and Brooklyn Robins.

While his birth name was Southern, he dropped the "u", adopting the name of Sothern.  He did this when he was 15 or 16 years old so that he could get into the Marines to fight in World War I, which somehow enabled him to lie about his age (the youngest age for service was 18).  He is known to have switched back to the use of his original last name of "Southern", which is used on his gravestone.  

Sothern saw some time as a minor league manager following his major league career including a stint as the skipper of the Kinston Eagles of the Coastal Plain League and the New Bern Bears.

Sothern was considered to be one of the fastest outfielders during his time.  He was on his way to being a star professional baseball player with a storied career but it abruptly ended.

Sothern was once the cause of a brawl in the outfield stands among fans.  He was being heckled by the home crowd and spit tobacco juice on one of the fans.  This started a brawl in the stands but he was able to escape getting involved in the melee.

In a brief five  year, 357 game career, he compiled a .280 batting average (379-for-1355) with 219 runs, 19 home runs and 115 runs batted in. Defensively, he recorded a .966 fielding percentage as an outfielder.

He was married multiple times fathering at least five children but the number is not known.

He died in New Bern, North Carolina in the Veterans Hospital and is buried in Onslow, NC.

Sources

 

1904 births
1977 deaths
Brooklyn Robins players
Philadelphia Phillies players
Pittsburgh Pirates players
Major League Baseball outfielders
Baseball players from Washington, D.C.
Minor league baseball managers
Martinsburg Blue Sox players
Wilkes-Barre Barons (baseball) players
Decatur Commodores players
Cumberland Colts players
Asheville Tourists players
Pittsfield Hillies players
Baltimore Orioles (IL) players
Jersey City Skeeters players
Hartford Senators players